Aileen Patricia Mills 1962 is a female former track and field athlete who competed for England in the 400 metres hurdles.

Athletics career
Mills became the British champion in 1985 when she won 1985 UK Athletics Championships.

Mills represented England in the 400 metres hurdles event, at the 1986 Commonwealth Games in Edinburgh, Scotland.

References

1963 births
Living people
Commonwealth Games competitors for England
Athletes (track and field) at the 1986 Commonwealth Games